Trichostrongylus affinis is a species of parasitic nematode in the genus Trichostrongylus. It primarily infects cottontails (Sylvilagus), but has also been found in the hispid cotton rat (Sigmodon hispidus) and the marsh rice rat (Oryzomys palustris).

See also 
 List of parasites of the marsh rice rat

References

Literature cited 
Kinsella, J.M. 1974. Comparison of helminth parasites of the cotton rat, Sigmodon hispidus, from several habitats in Florida. American Museum Novitates 2540:1–12.
Kinsella, J.M. 1988. Comparison of helminths of rice rats, Oryzomys palustris, from freshwater and saltwater marshes in Florida. Proceedings of the Helminthological Society of Washington 55(2):275–280.

Nematodes described in 1924
Trichostrongylidae
Parasites of rodents